Eukaryotic translation initiation factor 4E-binding protein 1 (also known as 4E-BP1) is a protein that in humans is encoded by the EIF4EBP1 gene.

Function 

This gene encodes one member of a family of translation repressor proteins. The protein directly interacts with eukaryotic translation initiation factor 4E (eIF4E), which is a limiting component of the multisubunit complex that recruits 40S ribosomal subunits to the 5' end of mRNAs. Interaction of this protein with eIF4E inhibits complex assembly and represses translation. This protein is phosphorylated in response to various signals including UV irradiation and insulin signaling, resulting in its dissociation from eIF4E and activation of cap-dependent mRNA translation.

High level of phosphorylated 4E-BP1 has been widely reported in human cancers, and is associated with a worse outcome in several malignancies.

Interactions 

EIF4EBP1 has been shown to interact with:
 EIF4E, 
 KIAA1303, and
 Mammalian target of rapamycin (mTOR).

References

Further reading